Terry Moloney may refer to:

 Terry Moloney (filmmaker) (born 1969), American writer, producer, director and editor
 Terry Moloney (hurler) (1939–2008), retired Irish hurler